The Dr. Cleo Miller House, also known as Ivy Hall, is a historic mansion in Nashville, Tennessee, U.S.. It was designed and built during 1934–1936. It was designed by Edwin A. Keeble in Tudor Revival architectural style. It was the residence of Dr. Cleo Miller, a college friend of Keeble's at Vanderbilt University.

The house has been listed on the National Register of Historic Places since August 25, 1995.

References

Houses on the National Register of Historic Places in Tennessee
Tudor Revival architecture in Tennessee
Houses completed in 1936
Houses in Nashville, Tennessee